Break Up is a 1998 American crime thriller film directed by Paul Marcus and written by Anne Amanda Opotowsky. It stars Bridget Fonda, Kiefer Sutherland, Hart Bochner, and Steven Weber.

Plot
After blacking out in a violent domestic battle, Jimmy (Bridget Fonda) awakens in the hospital to learn that her abusive husband, Frank (Hart Bochner), has died in a fiery crash, and that she is the prime suspect. As the police focus on building their case against Jimmy, she uncovers evidence indicating that Frank may not only still be alive, but getting away with murder. Jimmy, in a daring escape from police custody, races towards a final confrontation with justice and revenge.

Cast 
 Bridget Fonda as Jimmy Dade
 Kiefer Sutherland as Officer John Box
 Steven Weber as Officer Andrew Ramsey
 Hart Bochner as Frankie Dade
 Penelope Ann Miller as Grace
 Tippi Hedren as Mom
 Leslie Stefanson as Shelly

Reception 
The film was acquired in 1997 by Harvey Weinstein, who then ran Miramax with his brother Bob, who ran the Dimension label. “We are thrilled to be announcing this great movie as our first project so soon after the deal was made,” Miramax co-chairman Harvey Weinstein said. The film has received poor reviews.

See also

List of films featuring the deaf and hard of hearing

References

External links 
 
 

1998 films
1998 crime thriller films
1990s psychological thriller films
Films about domestic violence
Films produced by Elie Samaha
American crime thriller films
American psychological thriller films
1990s English-language films
1990s American films
Films about disability